The 1963–64 season is the 84th season of competitive football by Rangers.

Overview
Rangers played a total of 52 competitive matches during the 1963–64 season.

Results
All results are written with Rangers' score first.

Scottish First Division

Scottish Cup

League Cup

European Cup

Appearances

See also
 1963–64 in Scottish football
 1963–64 Scottish Cup
 1963–64 Scottish League Cup
 1963–64 European Cup

References 

Scottish football championship-winning seasons
Rangers F.C. seasons
Rangers